Emiko Raika (来家 恵美子, born January 24, 1975, in Kyoto, Japan) is a Japanese female professional boxer and mixed martial artist.

Although more Japanese women have taken up traditionally male sports such as karate, kickboxing and wrestling in recent years, many in Japan still believe that women should not box, because of the injury risk. Raika, who has suffered a broken nose and an eye socket fracture in fights, shrugs off the possibility of injuries.
"When I told friends that I want to become a boxer, they were surprised and put down my decision because I am a woman," said Raika. "But I had to resist. I like boxing and I wanted to do it. In fact, I am expressing myself through boxing. I am fighting not to beat the opponent, but for myself."

Biography

Early life
Raika lived with her grandmother until she was three. After her grandmother died, she spent the next 15 years in the Karyo-en children's home in Kyoto. Raika was a good student, among the top of her high school graduating class. She studied at Ogaki Women's College and became a licensed dental hygienist, later working at a dental clinic.  She quit the job after a month, because she did not like the uniform. She tried other jobs, but they did not make her happy.

"I felt as if I were not living and felt myself destroying." said Raika, "I was very weak mentally. I could choose to have an ordinary life, but I wanted more than just that - to become strong."

Boxing career 

Always enjoying rough sports such as wrestling and rugby, Raika joined a local boxing gym that she found while commuting to work at a battery manufacture, and trained to compete as an amateur boxer.

Raika had three wins in three amateur fights, and was named the most outstanding woman in a local amateur tournament, where she was spotted by Toshihiro Yamaki, a Tokyo gym owner.

With a growing number of Japanese women becoming interested in boxing, a group of gym owners had organized a women's boxing association in 1999, with Yamaki as its secretary general, called the Japanese Women's Boxing Commission (JWBC).

Yamaki was impressed by Raika, and asked her to join his gym and turn professional. She now devotes full-time to boxing.

Raika won the WIBA Featherweight World title from Australian Sharon Anyos in 2001, and successfully defended the title in a 2002 rematch. After destroying an overmatched Shelby Walker in two rounds for her second title defence on May 23, 2004, Raika made her 3rd title defence against the rugged (and undefeated) brawler Melissa Fiorentino on September 18, 2004, in Kyoto, Japan. It was called the WIBA 2004 Fight of the Year, Raika again successfully defended her crown via 10-round decision in a brutal toe-to-toe slugfest.

Raika then vacated her world title at featherweight (126 pounds) to move up in weight to the super featherweight division (130 pounds).

On March 13, 2005, in Tokyo, Japan, Raika lost a 10-round decision to Chevelle Hallback for the vacant WIBA Super Featherweight World Title.

On October 1, 2005, in Tokyo, Japan, Raika won an 8-round decision over Belinda Laracuente.

On May 20, 2006, in Cholla Province, Korea, Raika moved up another 2 weight classes, to 140 pounds, where she won a 10-round unanimous decision over Won Mi Chung, for the IFBA Light Welterweight World Title.

On June 10, 2006, in Tokyo, Japan, Raika knocked out Yoko Takahashi in the 4th round with a body shot.

On December 15, 2006, in Tokyo, Japan, Raika won a 10-round unanimous decision over Terri Blair to win the vacant WIBA Lightweight World Title.

Mixed martial arts record
 

|-
|Loss
|align=center|11–9–1 (1)
| So Yul Kim
|Technical Submission (rear naked choke)
|Shooto 2022 Vol.7
|
|align=center|3
|align=center|2:18
|Tokyo, Japan
|
|-
|Draw
|align=center|11–8–1 (1)
| Megumi Sugimoto
|Draw (majority)
|Shooto 2022 Vol.6
|
|align=center|2
|align=center|5:00
|Tokyo, Japan
|
|-
|Loss
|align=center|11–8 (1)
| Nori
|Decision (unanimous)
|Pancrase 321
|
|align=center|3
|align=center|5:00
|Tokyo, Japan
|
|-
|Loss
|align=center|11–7 (1)
| Takayo Hashi
|Decision (unanimous)
|Pancrase 316
|
|align=center|3
|align=center|5:00
|Tokyo, Japan
|
|-
|Win
|align=center|11–6 (1)
| Anne Karoline Nascimento
|Decision (split)
|Pancrase 309
|
|align=center|3
|align=center|5:00
|Tokyo, Japan
|
|-
|Win
|align=center|10–6 (1)
| Gleicielen Faria
|Submission (rear naked choke)
|Pancrase 307
|
|align=center|1
|align=center|0:45
|Tokyo, Japan
|
|-
|Loss
|align=center|9–6 (1)
| Mayra Cantuária
|Submission (armbar)
|Pancrase 304
|
|align=center|1
|align=center|3:17
|Tokyo, Japan
|
|-
|Win
|align=center|9–5 (1)
| Edna Oliveira
|Decision (split)
|Pancrase 302
|
|align=center|3
|align=center|5:00
|Tokyo, Japan
|
|-
|Loss
|align=center|8–5 (1)
| Kseniya Guseva
|Decision (split)
|Pancrase 297
|
|align=center|3
|align=center|5:00
|Tokyo, Japan
|
|-
|Win
|align=center|8–4 (1)
| Seul Gi Jeon
|Decision (unanimous)
|GRANDSLAM 7: Way of the Cage
|
|align=center|2
|align=center|5:00
|Tokyo, Japan
|
|-
|Win
|align=center|7–4 (1)
| Ji Yeon Seo
|Submission (rear naked choke)
|TTF Challenge 07
|
|align=center|2
|align=center|2:37
|Tokyo, Japan
|
|-
|Win
|align=center|6–4 (1)
| Hae In Kim
|Decision (split)
|Road FC 040
|
|align=center|2
|align=center|5:00
|Seoul, South Korea
|
|-
|Win
|align=center|5–4 (1)
| Jin Hee Kang
|Decision (unanimous)
|Road FC 037 XX
|
|align=center|3
|align=center|5:00
|Seoul, South Korea
|
|-
|Win
|align=center|4–4 (1)
| Satsuki Kodama
|Decision (unanimous)
|Deep Jewels 15
|
|align=center|2
|align=center|5:00
|Tokyo, Japan
|
|-
|Win
|align=center|3–4 (1)
| Jin Hee Kang
|Decision (unanimous)
|Deep Jewels 14
|
|align=center|2
|align=center|5:00
|Tokyo, Japan
|
|-
|Loss
|align=center|2–4 (1)
| Rin Nakai
|TKO (elbows)
|Pancrase 279
|
|align=center|3
|align=center|2:43
|Tokyo, Japan
|
|-
|Loss
|align=center|2–3 (1)
| Brogan Walker
|Decision (unanimous)
|PXC 50
|
|align=center|3
|align=center|5:00
|Mangilao, Guam
|
|-
|NC
|align=center|2–2 (1)
| Jessica-Rose Clark
|No Contest
|TTF Challenge 05
|
|align=center|3
|align=center|5:00
|Tokyo, Japan
|
|-
|Win
|align=center|2–2
| Slavka Vitaly
|Decision (split)
|Pancrase - 268
|
|align=center|3
|align=center|3:00
|Tokyo, Japan
|
|-
|Win
|align=center|1–2
| Sayako Fujita
|KO (punch)
|Real FC 2 - Zone & Real 2
|
|align=center|2
|align=center|2:06
|Yokohama,Japan
|
|-
|Loss
|align=center|0–2
| Shizuka Sugiyama
|Technical Submission (armbar)
|Deep - Dream Impact 2014: Omisoka Special
|
|align=center|1
|align=center|4:06
|Saitama, Japan
|
|-
|Loss
|align=center|0–1
| Su Jeong Lim
|Decision (unanimous)
|Revolution 2 - Start of the Revolution
|
|align=center|2
|align=center|5:00
|Seoul, South Korea
|

Professional boxing record

References

External links
 Raika's homepage
Emiko's WBAN Bio

1975 births
Japanese women boxers
Living people
Sportspeople from Kyoto
World boxing champions
World featherweight boxing champions
Lightweight boxers
Featherweight boxers
Japanese female mixed martial artists
Mixed martial artists utilizing boxing